Centre de services scolaire des Navigateurs is a French-language school service centre in Chaudière-Appalaches, Quebec, Canada. Its web site gives its address as Saint-Romuald, a former town annexed to Lévis several years ago. 
The director general is Esther Lemieux.

In 2020 the centre replaced the old Commission scolaire des Navigateurs.

Territory 
It operates the following schools.

District 1 
(Lotbinière,
Sainte-Croix,
Saint-Antoine-de-Tilly,
Dosquet, Quebec,
Saint-Flavien, Quebec,
Saint-Édouard, Quebec,
Leclercville, Quebec,
Joly,
Laurier-Station,
Saint-Apollinaire,
Sainte-Agathe-de-Lotbinière,
Saint-Agapit, Quebec,
Saint-Gilles et
Saint-Lambert)

École secondaire Beaurivage (High school) 
École secondaire Pamphile-Le May (High school) 
Falaise/Berge/Chêne,  
La Mennais, 
Clé-d’Or, 
La Source,
Caravelle, 
Quatre-Vents, 
Sentiers,
Épervière/Sainte-Thérèse,
Amitié/Étienne Chartier, Bac.

District 2 
(Saint-Nicolas,
Saint-Rédempteur et
Saint-Étienne-de-Lauzon)

École secondaire de l'Envol (High school) 
École de la Clé-du-Boisé (High school) 
Grand-Voilier, 
Odyssée, 
Étoile, 
Clair-Soleil, 
Martinière,
Ruche/Savio, 
Tournesol, 
Plein-Soleil et
Chanterelle.

District 3 
(Charny, Quebec,
Saint-Romuald, Quebec,
Saint-David, Quebec et 
Lévis, Quebec)

École secondaire les Etchemins (ESLE) (High school)
École secondaire de l'Aubier (High school)
Centre de formation en entreprise et récupération (CFER) (High school)
Petits-Cheminots (La Passerelle et
Notre-Dame), 
Saint-Louis-de-France,  
Notre-Dame-d’Etchemin, 
Auberivière, 
Desjardins,
Charles-Rodrigue/Pixels, 
Notre-Dame, 
Saint-Dominique, 
CÉAN, 
Centre
de formation professionnelle Gabriel-Rousseau, 
Centre de formation en mécanique de
véhicules lourds

District 4 
(Sainte-Hélène-de-Breakeyville,
Saint-Henri et
Saint-Jean-Chrysostome)
École secondaire de l'Horizon (High school)
Sainte-Hélène, 
Rose-des-Vents,
Alizé/Mousserons, 
Taniata,
Nacelle, 
Belleau/Gagnon,
Centre de formation en
montage de lignes, 
Centre national de
conduite d’engins de chantier

District 5 
(Pintendre et Lauzon)

École secondaire Champagnat/*École secondaire Guillaume-Couture (High schools)
École Îlot des Appalaches (High school) 
École Pointe-Lévy (High school)
Saint-Joseph, 
Sainte-Marie/du Ruisseau,
Moussaillons/du Boisé
Centre de formation professionnelle
de Lévis

Elementary schools
École Belleau
École Charles-Rodrigue
École Clair-Soleil
École de l'Alizé
École de l'Amitié
École de l'Auberivière
École de l'Épervière
École de l'Odyssée
École de la Berge
École de la Caravelle (Dosquet)
École de la Caravelle (Joly)
École de la Caravelle (Saint-Flavien)
École de la Chanterelle
École de la Clé-d'Or
École de la Clé-du-Boisé
École de la Falaise
École de la Nacelle
École de la Rose-des-Vents
École de la Ruche
École de la Source
École de Taniata
École Desjardins
École des Moussaillons
École des Mousserons
École des Petits-Cheminots
École du Bac
École du Boisé
École du Chêne
École du Grand-Fleuve Pavillon du Méandre
École du Grand-Fleuve Pavillon Maria-Dominique
École du Grand-Voilier
École du Ruisseau
École du Tournesol
École Étienne-Chartier
École Gagnon
École La Martinière
École La Mennais
École Notre-Dame
École Notre-Dame-d'Etchemin
École des Quatre-Vents
École Plein-Soleil
École Saint-Dominique
École Saint-Joseph
École Saint-Louis-de-France
École Sainte-Hélène
École Sainte-Marie
École Sainte-Thérèse

as well as the Centre de formation en entreprise et récupération and adult education programs.

References

External links
Centre de services scolaire des Navigateurs Official site, in French.

Lévis, Quebec
School districts in Quebec
Education in Chaudière-Appalaches